Bruce "Duke" Seifried (August 19, 1935 in Janesville, Wisconsin - September 29, 2018) was a maker of Miniature models for games.

Career
Duke Seifried began making "Der Kriegspielers" Napoleonic figures for retail sale in 1971, and then founded the Custom Cast company in February 1972 in Dayton, Ohio. A few years later, he released his own fantasy figures: the Fantastiques (1974) line, which among the first commercial 25mm fantasy figures made in the US. Shannon Appelcline noted that "Seifried requires a bit of additional attention, as he's one of the most influential people in the early hobbyist miniatures market. He created the idea of blister packs, to sell sets of infantry rather than individual figures, and later came up with the idea of including figures with slightly different poses in those packs. More importantly for the RPG industry, he came up with the phrase 'adventure gaming' — which was used to differentiate RPGs from 'wargaming' in the earliest days of the hobby."

Jim Oden of Heritage Models and Duke Seifried were both facing cash flow problems with their companies in January 1977, so they arranged to merge: Custom Cast, Heritage Models, and Jim Oden's retail store The Royal Guardsman (founded in 1974) all came together under the Heritage Models name, and Seifried moved to Dallas to support the new company. After continued financial hurdles in 1979, Seifried was in a restaurant talking with Jerry Campbell of Military Model Distributors about the need for a cash infusion to his company; by chance, they were overheard by millionaire Ray Stockman, who was won over by Seifried's arguments. Stockman bought out Jim Oden's share of the company, and Heritage Models was reborn as Heritage USA, itself a division of Heritage International.

Duke Seifried left Heritage around the start of 1982, heading over to TSR, who was at the time looking to start miniatures manufacturing themselves. At the Hobby Industries of America Show in late January 1983, TSR announced the creation of a new Toys, Hobby & Gift Division, under Duke Seifried. TSR was reorganized in June 1983 and laid off more than 70 employees, including Duke Seifried; Shannon Appelcline suggested that "Seifried's layoff was probably the most stunning, as he was in charge of TSR's new miniatures manufacturing — and was someone who really knew the business. Some suggested the reason was political, as Seifried had been among Gary Gygax's top supporters."

Duke Seifried was admitted into the Origins Hall of Fame in 2005.

Duke Seifried died on September 29, 2018.

References

External links
 

1935 births
2018 deaths
People from Janesville, Wisconsin